Trimethylgallium, often abbreviated to TMG or TMGa, is the organogallium compound with the formula Ga(CH3)3. It is a colorless, pyrophoric liquid. Unlike trimethylaluminium, TMG adopts a monomeric structure.  When examined in detail, the monomeric units are clearly linked by multiple weak Ga---C interactions, reminiscent of the situation for trimethylindium.

Preparation
Two forms of TMG are typically investigated: Lewis base adducts or TMG itself.  All are prepared by reactions of gallium trichloride with various methylating agents. When the methylation is conducted with methylmagnesium iodide in diethyl ether, the product is the poorly volatile diethyl ether adduct is produced. The ether ligand is not readily lost, although it may be displaced with liquid ammonia.   When the alkylation is conducted with methyl lithium in the presence of a tertiary phosphine the air-stable phosphine adduct is obtained:

Heating the solid phosphine adduct under vacuum liberates the base-free TMG:

Other non-volatile bases have been described.
Other methylating agents for the synthesis of TMG include dimethylzinc and trimethylaluminium.

Applications
TMG is the preferred metalorganic source of gallium for metalorganic vapour phase epitaxy (MOVPE) of gallium-containing compound semiconductors, such as GaAs, GaN, GaP, GaSb, InGaAs, InGaN, AlGaInP, InGaP and AlInGaNP. 
These material are used in the production of LED lighting and semiconductors as a metalorganic chemical vapor deposition precursor.

References

Chemical vapour deposition precursors
Gallium compounds
Methyl complexes